Pennon Group plc is a British water utility company based in Exeter, England. The company is listed on the London Stock Exchange and is a constituent of the FTSE 250 Index. 83% of the company's profits come from its subsidiary, South West Water.

History
The company was founded in 1989 as South West Water plc at the time of the privatisation of the Water Industry in England. In 1993 it acquired Haul Waste and in 1995 it bought Blue Circle Waste Management. It changed its name to Pennon Group plc in 1998. By 2016, the company employed approximately 4,500 people, and provided water and sewerage to 1.7 million customers in South West England.

The company successfully saw off a takeover bid from Terra Firma in 2004. It acquired Thames Waste Management in 2004, Wyvern Waste in 2006, Grosvenor Waste Management and Skipaway Holdings in 2007 and Shore Recycling in 2008. In 2016, the group acquired Bournemouth Water in a deal worth £100 million, integrating the company with South West Water, but keeping the Bournemouth Water name.

On 8 July 2020, global investment firm KKR completed its £4.2 billion acquisition of waste firm Viridor from Pennon Group.

In June 2021, the company acquired Bristol Water for $563 million.

Operations
The company's main asset is South West Water, which supplies water and sewerage services in Devon, Cornwall, and parts of Dorset and Somerset. South West Water covers 83% of the group's profits.

References

External links 
Pennon Group Official site

Water companies of England
Companies listed on the London Stock Exchange
Companies established in 1989
Companies based in Exeter